Events from 2020 in Easter Island.

Events 
Ongoing – COVID-19 pandemic in Easter Island

 19 March – The local government ordered a lockdown of the island and requested LATAM Airlines to evacuate all tourists on the island.
 24 March – The first case of COVID-19 on the island was confirmed.

References 

2020 in Easter Island
2020s in Easter Island
Years of the 21st century in Easter Island
Easter Island